William Harwood may refer to:

 William Harwood (photographer) (1883–1976), Welsh photographer and postcard collector
 William R. Harwood, American author and skeptic
 C. William Harwood (1948–1984), American conductor
 Bill Harwood (1920–1980), Australian rules footballer